The 1914 Isle of Man Tourist Trophy was the last held before the outbreak of the First World War.

Bad weather overshadowed the Junior race on Tuesday, 19 May, but Eric and Cyril Williams gained first and second place for AJS having passed Irish newcomer Frank Walker who had been leading on the second lap but for an unfortunate accident. Walker remounted his Royal Enfield, chased after the two men with determination but was parted from his machine twice more and still managed to flash over the finish line into third place while the two William's were still congratulating each other, but he failed to turn onto Bray Hill for the machine examination, crashed again on a barrier and succumbed to his injuries four days later.

Thursday, 21 May, was the Senior race day and after more than four hours only 6 m. 24 secs, separated the first three riders and there was the first dead heat in the history of the TT for 2nd place between Howard R Davies and Oliver Godfrey, the winner of the 1911 TT again riding an Indian.

Junior 350 cc race

Senior 500 cc race

References

External links
1914 Isle of Man TT results

1914 in British motorsport
1914 in motorsport
1914